Bhadravati or Bhadravathi is an industrial city or Steel Town and taluk in the Shivamogga District of Karnataka state, India.

History 
Bhadravati derives its name from the Bhadra River which flows through the city. It was earlier known as Benkipura, which in English means "city of fire", and earlier Benki Pattana'. At some point in history, it was probably also known as Venkipura ('venki' means 'turn' in Sanksrit), as it is situated at the place where Bhadra rever takes a 90 degree turn to the west, and then to the east. Hoysalas ruled the city. The Goddess "Haladammadevi & Antaragattammadevi" guard the city from past time. The sacred temples are still present in the city.

In 1413, Yerelakka nayaka (ಎರೆಲಕ್ಕನಾಯಕ) who was ruling the two cities called Dumma and Banuru (ದುಮ್ಮ, ಬಾಣೂರು), built two more cities, after clearing some of the wild forest, and named them, Narasimha Pura and Lakshmipura. Subsequently, these two cities became Benkipura or Venkipura and then Bhadravathi, as it is situated on the banks of Bhadra river. 

Iron ore from the hill station of Kemmannugundi and water from the Bhadra River helped the establishment of an iron mill in 1918 Known as Mysore Iron and Steel Limited (MISL). Bhadravathi's reputation as an industrial town was further enhanced with the establishment of a paper manufacturing firm, the Mysore Paper Mills Limited in 1936.

 Demographics 
Based on the 2011 Indian census, Bhadravati has a population of 160,392, of which males constitute 51% and females 49%. Bhadravati has an average literacy rate of 86.36%, higher than the national average of 59.5%; with 91.39% of the males and 81.46% of the females literate. 10% of the population is under 6 years of age. Kannada is the main language spoken in this city.

 Geography 

 Location 
Bhadravati lies in the central part of the Karnataka State, in the south-east corner of the Shivamogga district.

The Bhadra River flows from the Bhadra Wildlife Sanctuary through the Bhadravathi city, there are many mugger crocodile(Vulnerable) species present in the river Bhadra.

Bhadravati lies between Western Ghats (Malnad) and AreMalenad region.

The taluk borders five other taluks, the Shimoga Taluk to the west, the Honnali Taluk to the north, the Channagiri Taluk to the east, the Tarikere Taluk to the south-east, and the Narasimharajapura Taluk to the south-west.

 Climate 

 Regional 
There are 5 hobli headquarters in Bhadravathi:
 Kudligere (ಕೂಡ್ಲಿಗೆರೆ)
 Holehonnuru (ಹೊಳೆಹೊನ್ನೂರು)
 Anaveri (ಆನವೇರಿ)
 Hiruyur (ಹಿರಿಯೂರು)
 Singanamane (ಸಿಂಗನಮನೆ)
 Anjenaya agrahara

 Transport 

 Road 
One national highways passes through the city; NH-69(former NH-206); Two state highways pass through the city as well. Buses that go from Bangalore to Shivamogga stop at Bhadravati and take around six hours to complete the journey.

 Rail 
The Shivamogga–Bangalore train, the Birur–Shivamogga train, and the Mysuru–Shivamogga train all go through Bhadravati. It is well connected by rail to the Bengaluru city.

 Air 
Another airport is under construction in Shivamogga near Sogane.

 Economy 
Bhadravati has two major factories that take up a large part of the city: The Mysore Iron Works'', which is now known as Visvesvaraya Iron and Steel Plant factory, started by Nalvadi Krishnaraja Wodeyar along with his Diwan Sir M. Visvesvarayya, and the Mysore Paper Mills factory.

Tourist Places 
Bhadravati lies in the border of two Malnad districts Shimoga and Chickmagalur. Major Tourist attractions around the city include;

1. Lakshmi Narasimha Temple : The temple built in 13th century in Hoysala architecture situated in the heart of the city.

2. Bhadra Dam : Bhadra Dam is situated across Bhadra river which is20 km from the city.

3. Bhadra Wildlife Sanctuary : BWS is a protected area and a tiger reserve as part of Project Tiger, located 23 km south of Bhadravathi

4. Gondi : Gondi is situated at the foothills of western ghats, Check dam is the major tourist attraction of the place.

5. Kenchammanna Gudda and Gangur : situated amidst the western ghats, which is a major tourist attraction in monsoon.

Sports 
Vishveshwarayya Iron & Steel Plant Ground is located in Bhadravati. The stadium was built in 1960 and can hold 25,000 spectators. The ground has played host to Ranji Trophy cricket matches on two occasions for home team Karnataka.

Notable personalities 
Sports:
 Gundappa Viswanath, cricketer of the Indian cricket team in the 1970s

Entertainment:
 Bharathi Vishnuvardhan, actress
 Doddanna, actor in Kannada film industry, worked at Visvesvaraya Iron and Steel Limited
 S. Narayan, actor and movie director in Kannada film industry
 Asha Bhat, model, actress, beauty pageant and winner of Miss Supranational 2014, organized in Poland
 B. Ajaneesh Loknath, film score composer, singer, music director in Kannada film industry

Technology:
 Bannihatti Parameshwarappa Dakshayani, deputy project manager for the Mars Orbiter Mission at Indian Space Research Organisation Satellite Centre.

Kiran Mysore, India-Japan cross-border Venture capitalist and Forbes Asia 30 Under 30 Awardee.

References

External links 

 Official site of Bhadravati City Municipal Council
 Official site of The Mysore Paper Mills Limited
https://vtu.irins.org/profile/111390

Cities and towns in Shimoga district
Taluks in Shimoga District
Company towns in India
Cities in Karnataka